John Baptist Kakubi (September 23, 1929 – February 11, 2016) was a Roman Catholic bishop.

Ordained to the priesthood, in 1960, for what is now the Roman Catholic Archdiocese of Mbarara, Uganda, Kakubi was appointed bishop of the Diocese of Mbarara in 1969 and served until 1991.

See also

Notes

1929 births
2016 deaths
20th-century Roman Catholic bishops in Uganda
Roman Catholic bishops of Mbarara